Australaugeneria pottsi is a scale worm known from northern Australia from depths of 21m or less.

Description
Number of segments 38; elytra 15 pairs. Depigmented. Lateral antennae inserted ventrally (beneath prostomium and median antenna). Notochaetae distinctly thicker than neurochaetae, or thinner than neurochaetae. Bidentate neurochaetae absent.

Commensalism
A. pottsi is commensal. Its host taxa are alcyonacean corals.

References

Phyllodocida